Esa pareja feliz (translation: That Happy Couple) is a Spanish comedy film co-written and co-directed by Juan Antonio Bardem and Luis García Berlanga. It was their feature film debut. The film was made in 1951, but not released until 1953.

Plot 
Good-for-nothing, Juan marries Carmen to begin suffering what he thinks her and their friends' scorn at his proven inability to make a living, until he's lured to an apparent sound business that will for sure make them rich.

Cast
Fernando Fernán Gómez as Juan Granados Muñoz
Elvira Quintillá as Carmen González Fuentes
Félix Fernández as Rafa
José Luis Ozores as Luis
Fernando Aguirre as Organizador
Manuel Arbó as Esteban
Carmen Sánchez as Dueña del salón de té
Matilde Muñoz Sampedro as Amparo
Antonio García Quijada as Manolo
Antonio Garisa as Florentino
José Franco as Tenor
Alady as Técnico
Rafael Bardem as Don Julián, el Comisario
Rafael Alonso as Gerente Seguros 'La Víspera'
José Orjas
Francisco Bernal
Lola Gaos as Reina en Rodaje
Matías Prats as Locutor Deportivo (voice)

External links
 

1951 comedy films
1951 films
1950s Spanish-language films
Spanish black-and-white films
Films set in Madrid
Films directed by Luis García Berlanga
Films directed by Juan Antonio Bardem
Spanish comedy films
1953 comedy films
1953 films
1950s Spanish films